The Jaffe/Swearingen SA-32T is a prototype American turboprop- powered training aircraft with side-by-side seating. A single example was built in the late 1980s, but no production followed.

Design and development
The SA-32T was developed by Ed Swearingen from his Swearingen SX300 piston-engined homebuilt aircraft on behalf of the Jaffe Aircraft Corporation, who hoped to sell it as a relatively low-cost military trainer. The resulting design was a low-wing cantilever monoplane, with a mainly metal structure, but with composite engine cowlings and tips of wings and tails. Skin thicknesses were increased by 50% compared with the SX300 to make the airframe stronger. A laminar flow wing was used, which was claimed to give jet-like handling capabilities, while hardpoints could be fitted to allow weapons to be carried. The pilot and instructor sat side by side under a bubble canopy, with provision for ejector seats to be fitted. It had a retractable nosewheel undercarriage. The prototype was powered by a single Allison 250-B17D turboprop engine driving a three-bladed propeller.

A single prototype was built by Swearingen Aircraft Corporation, making its first flight on 31 May 1989, which was displayed at the Paris Air Show in June that year. The design was offered to the United States Air Force as a replacement for its aging Cessna T-37 Tweet trainers, and to West Germany and Turkey. In 1990, a version with tandem seating rather than the side-by-side seating of the prototype was proposed. Development of the SA-32T had been abandoned by 1992, although as of January 2016, the prototype is still registered as airworthy by the Federal Aviation Administration.

Specifications (Performance estimated)

References

External links
Photo

Swearingen aircraft
1980s United States military trainer aircraft